A totally implantable cochlear implant (TICI) is a new type of cochlear implant and is currently in development. Unlike a conventional cochlear implant, which has both an internal component (the implant) and an external component (the audio processor), all the components of the TICI - including the microphone and battery - are implanted under the skin. This makes the TICI completely invisible from the outside.

The TICI is currently in the clinical feasibility study stage of development. The first patient in Europe was implanted with a TICI in September 2020 as part of a clinical trial.

Parts 
The TICI contains the same internal components as a conventional cochlear implant: the magnet, antenna coil, electronics and the electrode array, however will also include the features of an audio processor including an implanted rechargeable battery and microphone. The TICI components may be integrated into a single case, the so-called monobody design, or the various components may be attached to one another by connectors, thereby allowing replacement of each of the several modules in case of failure.

Some external hardware will still be required. The internal battery is charged transcutaneously using an external charger, for example while the user sleeps at night.  A remote control or app may also be needed in order to switch the implant on and off, adjust the microphone sensitivity and indicate the battery status, among other functions.

Benefits 
A totally implantable — and therefore “invisible” — cochlear implant is seen as a benefit to users, particularly those who feel self-conscious about wearing visible hearing devices.  

In addition, as the TICI has no external components, it is less susceptible to small breakages from knocks and falls. The lack of external parts also means that they cannot be mislaid – a common problem with pediatric users.

A TICI can function while showering, swimming, and during many types of vigorous physical activity. This allows the user to hear while carrying out these activities.

References 

Biomedical engineering
Medical devices